The 1998 Supercopa de España was a Spanish football competition, played over two legs on 18 August and 22 August 1998. It was contested by Mallorca, who were Spanish Cup runners-up in 1997–98, and Barcelona, who won the 1997–98 Spanish League as well as the 1997–98 Spanish Cup.

Match details

First leg

Second leg

References 

Supercopa de Espana Final
Supercopa de Espana 1998
Supercopa de Espana 1998
Supercopa de España